Walker Thomas (born August 13, 1963) is an American politician who has served in the Kentucky House of Representatives from the 8th district since 2017.

Controversy over anti-Semitic remarks 
On February 23, 2022, the Lexington Herald-Leader reported that during a committee meeting, Thomas and committee chair Sen. Rick Girdler made use of the anti-Semitic phrase "Jew them down" to refer to bargaining for a lower price on a $1 lease.  According to the story, after a presentation about the lease, which was necessary due to recent storms, Walker had been picked up on a hot mic laughing and asking if the state could "jew them down on the price." Girdler repeated the question and then paused, and said, “That ain’t the right word to use. ‘Drop them down,’ I guess.” Thomas later apologized, saying that the remark was "not who he was."

References

1963 births
Living people
Republican Party members of the Kentucky House of Representatives
21st-century American politicians